Raful Neal (June 6, 1936 – September 1, 2004) was an American Louisiana blues singer, harmonicist and songwriter from the United States.

Neal was born in Baton Rouge, Louisiana, and reared by his aunt and uncle on a tenant farm in Chamberlin, West Baton Rouge Parish. He  began playing the harmonica at age 14. He played with Buddy Guy in a band called the Clouds. His first record, "Sunny Side of Love" (1958) on Peacock Records, was not successful.

Neal's first album, called Louisiana Legend, was initially issued by King Snake Records and later by Alligator Records in 1990. His 1991 album I Been Mistreated was released on Ichiban Records. Neal toured globally. In 1997, his harmonica playing was featured on the album Live: Swampland Jam by Tab Benoit. Neal's album Old Friends was issued in 1998.

Neal died of cancer in Baton Rouge in September 2004. Nine of his ten children are also blues musicians, and several performed with him on his later releases on the Alligator label.

See also
 Jackie Neal, a daughter
 Kenny Neal, a son

References

External links
Raful Neal biography from LouisianaMusic.com
Raful Neal biography from mp3.com
Raful Neal biography from Alligator Records

1936 births
2004 deaths
Musicians from Baton Rouge, Louisiana
American blues singers
American blues harmonica players
Swamp blues musicians
Louisiana blues musicians
Deaths from cancer in Louisiana
Burials in Louisiana
20th-century American singers
Blues musicians from Louisiana
Singers from Louisiana
20th-century American male singers